Beta-1,3-galactosyl-O-glycosyl-glycoprotein beta-1,6-N-acetylglucosaminyltransferase (O-glycosyl-oligosaccharide-glycoprotein N-acetylglucosaminyltransferase I, beta6-N-acetylglucosaminyltransferase, uridine diphosphoacetylglucosamine-mucin beta-(1->6)-acetylglucosaminyltransferase, core 2 acetylglucosaminyltransferase, core 6-beta-GlcNAc-transferase A, UDP-N-acetyl-D-glucosamine:O-glycosyl-glycoprotein (N-acetyl-D-glucosamine to N-acetyl-D-galactosamine of beta-D-galactosyl-1,3-N-acetyl-D-galactosaminyl-R) beta-1,6-N-acetyl-D-glucosaminyltransferase) is an enzyme with systematic name UDP-N-acetyl-D-glucosamine:O-glycosyl-glycoprotein (N-acetyl-D-glucosamine to N-acetyl-D-galactosamine of beta-D-galactosyl-(1->3)-N-acetyl-D-galactosaminyl-R) 6-beta-N-acetyl-D-glucosaminyltransferase. This enzyme catalyses the following chemical reaction

 UDP-N-acetyl-D-glucosamine + beta-D-galactosyl-(1->3)-N-acetyl-D-galactosaminyl-R  UDP + beta-D-galactosyl-(1->3)-[N-acetyl-beta-D-glucosaminyl-(1->6)]-N-acetyl-D-galactosaminyl-R

References

External links 
 

EC 2.4.1